A Cassette Tape Culture (Phase Two) is a collection by the American industrial band ATelecine released in 2011, of previously unreleased outtakes, demos, and remixes from sessions from the first three out-of-print aTelecine releases aVigillant Carpark EP, ...And Six Dark Hours Pass, and A Cassette Tape Culture (Phase One). Some obviously correspond to earlier released material while others do not allude to anything else but a foundation.

Track listing
 "Water" (Tape Mix)
 "The Smuggler" (Draft One)
 "The Pleasure Dome" (Tape Mix)
 "The Crucher" (Oct 88 Mix)
 "Red Sun" (Tape Mix)
 "It Just Is" (Clavis Mix)
 "I Came I Sat I Stayed Put" (Tape Mix)
 "From End to End" (early 256 demo)
 "ENT." (BC ver)
 "Blue" (lost demo)
 "Stardream" (Shitpump Mix)
 "Wind Pipe Machine" (Org)
 "Giant" (early demo)
 "Stockton_Modesto_Skate Park_Meth Head_23 Bucks Left" (A Linter Mix)

References

2011 albums
ATelecine albums